Frank Jan Anton Leistra (born 1 April 1960 in Delft) is a former field hockey goalkeeper from the Netherlands, who was a member of the Dutch team that won the bronze medal at the 1988 Summer Olympics in Seoul.

Leistra played a total number of 159 international matches for his native country, and made his debut on 1 June 1985 in a friendly match against Scotland. In 1990 he won the world title with the national team at the 1990 Men's Hockey World Cup in Lahore, Pakistan. He resigned after the fourth-place finishing at the 1992 Summer Olympics in Barcelona.

References
 Dutch Hockey Federation
 Dutch Olympic Committee

External links
 

1960 births
Dutch male field hockey players
Olympic field hockey players of the Netherlands
Field hockey players at the 1988 Summer Olympics
Field hockey players at the 1992 Summer Olympics
Living people
Olympic bronze medalists for the Netherlands
Sportspeople from Delft
Olympic medalists in field hockey
Medalists at the 1988 Summer Olympics
1990 Men's Hockey World Cup players
20th-century Dutch people
21st-century Dutch people